The Social Insurance Fund of the Russian Federation is one of the state budget funds, created to provide for the compulsory social security of Russian citizens. It was created on January 1, 1991, by a joint decree of the Council of Ministers of the Russian Federation and the Federation of Independent Trade Unions of Russia No. 600/9-3 from December 25, 1990.

The activities of the fund is governed by the Budget Code of the Russian Federation and the Federal Law "On the basis of compulsory social security", as well as other laws and regulations.

The State Duma decided (July 5, 2022) to fuse this fund with the Pension Fund of the Russian Federation and to establish a new united social fund titled Pension and Social Insurance Fund of the Russian Federation since January 1, 2023.

Budget
The income of the fund comes from compulsory social insurance, formed by contributions, from insurance contributions from industrial accidents and occupational diseases and from subsidies from the federal budget and the Federal Mandatory Medical Insurance Fund of the Russian Federation.

Functions
Payment of benefits under compulsory social insurance, including the payment of temporary disability benefits ("Hospital")
Provision for persons entitled to vouchers for spa treatment
Providing disabled persons with technical means of rehabilitation and prosthetic
Payment of benefits and maternity leave, benefits for childbirth, childcare *Benefits for children up to the age of eighteen years
Payment of birth certificates
Surcharge (25%) for primary health care working citizens
Extra charge for check-ups working citizens
Payment of additional medical examinations of working people engaged in work with harmful and dangerous factors
Payment (full or partial) for the children of insured persons in the cost of permits located in the territory of the Russian Federation sanatorium and health organizations, open to the established order (including recreational facilities and improvement of children)

Chairmen
Natalia D. Malakhatkina (1991/93);
Yuri P. Shatyrenko (December 10, 1993 -  May 29, 1996);
Yuri A. Kosarev (November 4, 1996 - April 14, 2004);
Galina N. Karelova (April 14, 2004 - December 13, 2007);
Sergey V. Kalashnikov (March 25, 2008 - January 29, 2010);
Lyudmila N. Rau (January 29 - May 15, 2010);
Sergey A. Afanasiev (May 15, 2010 - March 21, 2013);
Andrew S. Kigim (March 21, 2013 - February 12, 2021);
Alexey P. Polikashin (acting since February 17, 2021).

References

External links
 Official website 

Society of Russia
Economy of Russia
Taxation in Russia
Social security in Russia